Tawas Township is a civil township of Iosco County in the U.S. state of Michigan. The population was 1,684 at the 2000 census. Tawas City is adjacent to the township.

Communities
Alabaster Junction is an unincorporated community located west of US 23.

Geography

Demographics
As of the census of 2000, there were 1,684 people, 635 households, and 485 families residing in the township. There were 742 housing units at an average density of 22.2 per square mile (8.6/km). The racial makeup of the township was 97.92% White, 0.30% African American, 0.65% Native American, 0.42% Asian, 0.12% from other races, and 0.59% from two or more races. Hispanic or Latino of any race were 0.65% of the population.

There were 635 households, out of which 32.8% had children under the age of 18 living with them, 65.8% were married couples living together, 6.8% had a female householder with no husband present, and 23.5% were non-families. 19.2% of all households were made up of individuals, and 9.3% had someone living alone who was 65 years of age or older.  The average household size was 2.55 and the average family size was 2.90.

In the township the population was spread out, with 24.5% under the age of 18, 5.3% from 18 to 24, 25.0% from 25 to 44, 25.4% from 45 to 64, and 19.8% who were 65 years of age or older.  The median age was 42 years. For every 100 females, there were 96.7 males.  For every 100 females age 18 and over, there were 96.9 males.

The median income for a household in the township was $37,941, and the median income for a family was $40,250. Males had a median income of $31,486 versus $20,119 for females. The per capita income for the township was $16,632.  About 6.2% of families and 8.2% of the population were below the poverty line, including 10.8% of those under age 18 and 7.1% of those age 65 or over.

Administration
 Supervisor: Paul Westcott
 Clerk: Melissa Stewart
 Treasurer: Sheri Grabow
 Trustee: Ervin Biggs
 Trustee: William Cholger
 Zoning Administrator: Rick Wilson

Current as of July 2006

References

Townships in Iosco County, Michigan
Townships in Michigan